Sinov Raj is an Indian film playback singer known for his works in Malayalam and Telugu films. He made his debut as the playback singer in the Malayalam movie Camel Safari singing the song "Sayyan". He works mostly in the Malayalam & Telugu film industry. He has a background of a band which started before with his few friends.

Personal life 

Sinov Raj was born as the elder son of Mr Jayarajan and Smitha Jayaraj in Calicut in 1990; he also has a sister named Janvi. Sinov He completed his schooling in three schools ; N.S.S School, M.C.C Higher Secondary School and Zamorin's Higher Secondary School. He later joined N.S.S College, Chalappuram and graduated from there with a Bachelor of Commerce Degree.

Career 
Sinov Raj started his career with some stage shows and other small concerts. In 2012, he and his group of friends started a band called "Tatva". Then he and his band went on to bigger stages for bigger concerts. Later in 2013, he made his debut in the Malayalam movie Camel Safari as a playback singer with the song "Sayyan". Then he became part of the Banglore Days Malayalam movie and served as in the medley - acoustic version of Ethukariravilum and Thumbipenne song with Abin Sagar. His biggest hit is from the Telugu film Fidaa with the song "Hey Pillagada".  He released his newest song from his band called "Hey Bro" and has also sung several other songs.

References

External links 
 

Living people
1990 births
Malayalam playback singers
Telugu playback singers